Song Qian (born February 2, 1987), known professionally as Victoria or Victoria Song, is a Chinese singer, dancer, actress, model, host and author known for her work as the leader of South Korean girl group f(x).

In 2010, Song gained fame as part of We Got Married Season 2, as well as being a cast member of KBS's Invincible Youth.  She is also known for her roles in television series When Love Walked In (2012), Beautiful Secret (2015), Ice Fantasy (2016), A Life Time Love (2017), Moonshine and Valentine (2018), Find Yourself (2020); and the films My New Sassy Girl (2016), My Best Friend's Wedding (2016), and Wished (2017).

Song ranked 74th on Forbes China Celebrity 100 list in 2017, 41st in 2019 and 14th in 2020.

Life and career

1987–2011: Early life and career beginnings

Song Qian was born in Qingdao, Shandong. She left her hometown at a young age to study Chinese traditional dance at the Beijing Dance Academy. After her high school graduation, she was accepted to the Beijing Dance Academy and majored in Chinese ethnic dance. In September 2007, Song was first scouted by an SM Entertainment casting agent while in Beijing dance competition and eventually cast into SM Entertainment after passing the audition under SM Casting System. She was originally trained to prepare for her acting and modeling career in South Korea.
Prior to debuting, Song was introduced to the public through various appearances in music videos and commercials; her first appearance is in Spris commercial with Lee Joon-gi in early 2008. She made her official debut as a member of f(x) in September 2009.

In June 2010, Song became a cast member for the first season of the variety show Invincible Youth in which she was a part of G7, consisting of 7 female idols from various groups. She was also cast on the reality show We Got Married with Nichkhun of 2PM. The couple was collectively known as Khuntoria in the variety show. Nichkhun and Song both gained entertainment-wide popularity as a result of the show's success. At the end of the year, Song won the 'Popularity Award' at the MBC Entertainment Awards for her stint in We Got Married.

2012–2017: Acting roles and rise in popularity 

In January 2012, Song was cast to play the lead role in the Chinese-Taiwanese co-production When Love Walked In, alongside label-mate Zhou Mi, and Calvin Chen of the group Fahrenheit. The drama reached the number one spot in viewership ratings. She won the 'Best New Actress' award at the China TV Drama Awards for her performance. In December 2012, Song released a photo-essay book titled Victoria's Hong-Ma, which included her travel experiences in Hong Kong and Macao. The Chinese version of the book was subsequently released in 2013.

In 2013 she became the MC for KBS's program Glitter alongside actress Kim So-eun.

In 2014, Song was chosen to host the Korean-Chinese variety show titled Strongest Group together with Zhou Mi. She was also featured in his solo album single, titled "Loving You". Song then starred in Zhang Liyin's music videos "Agape" and "Not Alone" as the lead female character alongside former EXO member Tao.

In 2015, it was also revealed that Song would team up with Chinese manager Jia Shikai for her local activities.
Following the setup of her studio, Song starred in Hunan TV's music romance drama Beautiful Secret. She released a solo single titled "Star Tears" for the drama's soundtrack. The drama eventually went on to record the highest average viewership ratings for the first half of 2016 in China.

In 2016, Song starred in My New Sassy Girl with Cha Tae-hyun. The film, a remake of My Sassy Girl (2001), was released simultaneously in South Korea and China. She then appeared in the Chinese remake film of My Best Friend's Wedding, playing the role of Kimberly Wallace in the original film. The same year, Song starred in Ice Fantasy, an epic fantasy drama adapted from the novel of the same name by Guo Jingming. She sang an OST for Ice Fantasy, titled "Li Luo", which is also her character's name in the drama. Song was next cast in the modern romance drama Endless August by Anni Baobei alongside Rain.

From January to April 2017, Song co-hosted the variety program Ace vs Ace.  She also became a fixed cast on Zhejiang TV's Beat The Champions, which started airing in April. In June, she starred alongside Huang Xiaoming in the fantasy romance drama A Life Time Love, based on the novel Once Promised by Tong Hua. In July, she co-starred in fantasy comedy film Wished, directed by Dayyan Eng, which garnered good reviews for Song and had the highest audience scores across the top 4 ticketing platforms for local Chinese comedies released that summer. In August, she joined the cast of Hunan TV's female-centric reality show Up Idol.

2018–present: Solo debut, acting and debut album

In January 2018, Song starred in The Chronicles of Town Called Jian, a mystery period drama produced by Li Shaohong; based on the "Tarot Goddess Sleuths" series. The drama has previously completed filming in 2014.

On March 13, 2018, she released her debut solo single "Roof on Fire" along with its music video. She has also joined the dance-oriented variety show, Hot Blood Dance Crew, and talent scouting program The Next Top Bang as a mentor.

In May 2018, Song starred in fantasy romance drama Moonshine and Valentine alongside Huang Jingyu. The series received positive reviews, and Song was praised for her acting performance. In October she starred in the fantasy adventure film Legend of the Ancient Sword, based on the video game Gu Jian Qi Tan 2. The same year, she was cast in modern romance drama Broker alongside Luo Yunxi, playing an intelligent and beautiful scientist.

On September 5, 2019, Song announced that her contract with SM Entertainment had expired and that she would be leaving the company. On the same day, SM Entertainment announced that Song had not yet left the company, but rather the two were finding new ways to work together.

In 2019, Song  starred in the modern romance dramas Love Under the Moon and sung the opening theme song "Practice To Be Friends". In 2020, Song starred in the romantic comedy drama Find Yourself. The drama was a huge hit and Song gained further recognition for her role as a working woman who is inexperienced in love.

On May 19, 2020, Victoria released her self-titled solo album digitally after being postponed since 2017. The album consists of ten tracks, including the previously released single "Roof on Fire" (2018) and three English-language tracks. The lead single, "Up To Me" was also released in the same day along with its music video. The album sold over 250,000 copies in its first 22 hours of pre-sale, making Victoria Song the fastest Chinese female artist to reach diamond certification on QQ Music in 2020. The album reached #1 place on QQ Music after sold over than 300,000 copies in the first weeks. In the next few weeks, she also released music videos for "怀念" and "官能支配 (Functional Control)".

In the summer of 2020, Victoria participated in the 2020 edition of the Chinese version of "Produce 101", called Chuang 2020 where she was an MC and a mentor. She also performed on the show.

In August 2020, Victoria's female-centric drama Love Yourself was released both in China and Internationally. She stars as a television reporter who is lost about love.

In 2021, Song terminated her endorsement contract with the clothing manufacturer H&M  after it criticized China for human rights violations against Uyghurs in the Xinjiang region of China where cotton for clothing products is grown. In April 2021, SM Entertainment announced that their contract with Victoria had ended.

In 2022, Victoria starred in Beloved Life as Du Di, a resident Ob-gyn. 

In 2023, Victoria took the role of Han Lu in the film Post Truth. She had been on a roadshow around China to promote the film.

Philanthropy
In 2008, Song and Super Junior-M participated in a campaign for Chinese athletes during the 2008 Beijing Summer Olympics. In 2010, she and fellow f(x) members were appointed ambassadors for a blood donation campaign for "World Blood Donor Day". The following year, she participated in the press conference to promote awareness for a fundraising campaign to help children in Africa, which was jointly organized by the Red Cross and UNICEF.

In November 2012, she and Kangta also attended a cultural charity event in China, where they gave music and dance lessons to children in need. The event was organized by SM Entertainment and CJ E&M to celebrate 20 years of China and South Korea's diplomatic ties.

Towards the end of 2014, Song opened a flea market where she sold her personal items for charity. She donated all proceeds to UNICEF on December 31. In April 2015, she and other Beautiful Secret cast members launched "Beautiful Childhood Secret" to promote awareness for children with hearing disabilities. The members and crew ordered customized picture books for the disabled children. In the same month, Song also auctioned off a handmade doll, named "Song Song", on the UNICEF charity auction site and in June, she participated in UNICEF's "Help Nepal Children" charity bracelet project.

Discography

Studio albums

Singles

Collaborations

Soundtracks

Filmography

Film

Television series

Variety show

Bibliography

Awards and nominations

Forbes China Celebrity 100

References

External links

 
 
 
 

1987 births
Living people
Singers from Shandong
Musicians from Qingdao
Chinese female dancers
Chinese K-pop singers
Chinese idols
F(x) (group) members
K-pop singers
Japanese-language singers
Chinese expatriates in South Korea
Actresses from Qingdao
Chinese film actresses
Chinese television actresses
Korean-language singers of China
21st-century Chinese actresses
SM Entertainment artists
Beijing Dance Academy alumni
21st-century Chinese women singers